Major General Shaun Alex Burley,  (born 4 March 1962) is a British Army officer who served as Military Secretary.

Military career
Burley was commissioned into the Royal Engineers in 1982. He became Commander of 8 Force Engineer Brigade (undertaking work at Camp Bastion and then in Basra) as well as Commander Royal Engineers for the Field Army before being appointed Chief of Staff at the Land Warfare Centre.  After a tour as Deputy Assistant Chief of Staff for Organisation in Headquarters Land Command, he went on to be Assistant Commandant (Land) at the Joint Services Command and Staff College in December 2009 and General Officer Commanding, Theatre Troops in 2011. He became Military Secretary in March 2013.

References

|-
 

1962 births
Living people
British Army major generals
Companions of the Order of the Bath
Members of the Order of the British Empire
Royal Engineers officers
Military personnel from Warwickshire
People from Shipston-on-Stour